Jairo Díaz (born 7 February 1945) is a former Colombian cyclist. He competed in the sprint and tandem events at the 1972 Summer Olympics.

References

External links
 

1945 births
Living people
Colombian male cyclists
Olympic cyclists of Colombia
Cyclists at the 1972 Summer Olympics
Place of birth missing (living people)
20th-century Colombian people